The 2012–13 Combined Counties Football League season (known as the 2012–13 Cherry Red Records Combined Counties Football League for sponsorship reasons) was the 35th in the history of the Combined Counties Football League, a football competition in England.

Premier Division

The Premier Division featured three new teams in a league of 22 teams after the promotion of Guildford City to the Southern Football League:
Bedfont Sports, promoted as runners-up in the First Division.
Guernsey, promoted as champions of the First Division.
Hartley Wintney, promoted as third-placed club in the First Division.

For this season only, the FA were to promote a second club from two of the following six Step 5 leagues: Combined Counties League, Eastern Counties League, Essex Senior League, Kent League, Spartan South Midlands League and the Sussex County League. This was to fulfil the expansion of the Isthmian League Divisions One North and South from 22 to 24 clubs each.  The two clubs were to be promoted on a points per game basis, and the two runners-up with the best PPG were VCD Athletic (Kent Football League) and Guernsey (Combined Counties League). Three others – Aylesbury United (Spartan South Midlands League), Redhill (Sussex County League) and Barkingside (Essex Senior League) – were also confirmed as promoted by the FA on 17 May, due to resignations and non-promotions elsewhere.
From this league, only Badshot Lea, Egham Town, Epsom & Ewell, Guernsey, Hanworth Villa, Molesey, South Park and Wembley applied for promotion.

League table

Results

Division One

Division One featured four new teams in a league of 18 teams: 
AFC Croydon Athletic, a new club formed after Croydon Athletic folded.
Banstead Athletic, relegated from the Premier Division.
Epsom Athletic, promoted as champions of the Surrey Elite Intermediate League.
Mole Valley SCR, relegated from the Premier Division.

Eversley F.C. changed their name to Eversley & California F.C. They were ineligible for promotion after failing to achieve the required ground grading from the league.

League table

Results

References
 League tables

External links
 Combined Counties League Official Site

2012-13
9